San Rafael District is one of eight districts of the province Ambo in Peru.

See also 
 K'uchu Hanka
 P'aqla Tanka
 Wamanripayuq

References